Laona is a genus of gastropods belonging to the family Laonidae.

The species of this genus are found in Europe and America.

Species:
Laona alternans 
Laona californica 
Laona chilla 
Laona condensa 
Laona confusa 
Laona grandioculi 
Laona nanseni 
Laona pruinosa 
Laona quadrata 
Laona thurmanni 
Laona ventricosa 
Synonyms
 Laona finmarchica (M. Sars, 1859): synonym of Praephiline finmarchica (M. Sars, 1859)
 Laona flexuosa (M. Sars, 1859): synonym of Laona pruinosa (W. Clark, 1827)

References

 Chaban E.M. & Soldatenko E.V. (2009) Description of a new genus Praephiline gen. nov. (Gastropoda: Opisthobranchia: Philinidae). Zoosystematica Rossica 18(2): 205-211.

External links
 Sars, M. (1870). VII. Bidrag til Kundskab om Christianiafjordens Fauna, af M. Sars. II. Crustacea. Beskrivelse af nye, paa Annelider snyltende Copepodeformer. NYT Magazin for Naturvidenskaberne. 17(2-3): 113-226, pl. 8-13.
 Monterosato, T. A. di. (1884). Nomenclatura generica e specifica di alcune conchiglie mediterranee. Virzi, printed for the Author, Palermo, 152 pp.
 Oskars T.R., Bouchet P. & Malaquias M.A. (2015). A new phylogeny of the Cephalaspidea (Gastropoda: Heterobranchia) based on expanded taxon sampling and gene markers. Molecular Phylogenetics and Evolution. 89: 130-150
  Serge GOFAS, Ángel A. LUQUE, Joan Daniel OLIVER,José TEMPLADO & Alberto SERRA (2021) - The Mollusca of Galicia Bank (NE Atlantic Ocean); European Journal of Taxonomy 785: 1–114

Cephalaspidea